Zainudin bin Nordin (Jawi: زاينودين نوردين; born 3 July 1963) is a Singaporean former politician who served as Mayor of Central Singapore District. A former member of the governing People's Action Party, he was the Member of Parliament (MP) representing the Bishan–Toa Payoh North ward of Bishan–Toa Payoh GRC between 2001 and 2011, later the Toa Payoh East ward between 2011 and 2015. 

Zainudin was also formerly the president of the Football Association of Singapore (FAS) between 2009 and 2016. He is currently the chief strategy officer at food and beverage group, Iron Chef F&B.

Political career 
Zainudin retired from politics in 2015, citing wanting to spend more time with his family.

Career 
Zainudin served as president of the FAS between 2009 and 2016.

In April 2017, Zainudin was arrested, along with three others, for suspected misuse of funds at Tiong Bahru Football Club. They were later released on bail. In September 2021, charges were dropped against Zainudin and one other.After a lengthy investigation, he was found to be innocent of all charges. The charges against him were dropped and he was cleared. 

Zainudin is currently the chief strategy officer at food and beverage group, Iron Chef F&B.

Personal life 
During a parliamentary speech during the Budget 2013 Committee of Supply, Zainudin revealed he did not serve National Service (NS) as he was exempted per the National Service policy's exclusion of some Malays.

Honours
 Chevalier in the National Order of Merit, awarded 25 April 2015 by the French Ambassador to Singapore.

References

External links

 

1963 births
Living people
Members of the Parliament of Singapore
People's Action Party politicians
Singaporean people of Malay descent
Singaporean Muslims